This is a list of fossiliferous stratigraphic units in Uruguay.



List of fossiliferous stratigraphic units

See also 
 
 South American land mammal ages
 Gomphothere fossils in Uruguay
 List of fossiliferous stratigraphic units in Namibia

Notes and references

Notes

References

Bibliography

Further reading 
 D. Closs. 1967. Goniatiten mit Radula und Kieferapparat in der Itararé-Formation von Uruguay. Paläontologische Zeitschrift 41:19-37
 G. Faccio. 1994. Dinosaurian eggs from the Upper Cretaceous of Uruguay. In K. Carpenter, K. F. Hirsch & J. R. Horner (eds.), Dinosaur Eggs and Babies 47-55
 D. Fortier, D. Perea, and C. Schultz. 2011. Redescription and phylogenetic relationships of Meridiosaurus vallisparadisi, a pholidosaurid from the Late Jurassic of Uruguay. Zoological Journal of the Linnean Society 163:S257-S272
 G. M. Gasparini and M. Ubilla. 2011. Platygonus sp. (Mammalia: Tayassuidae) in Uruguay (Raigón? formation; Pliocene - early Pleistocene), comments about its distribution and paleoenvironmental significance in South America. Journal of Natural History 45(45-46):2855-2870
 F. v. Huene. 1934. Neue Saurier-Zähne aus der Kreide von Uruguay [New saurian teeth from the Cretaceous of Uruguay]. Centralblatt für Mineralogie, Geologie und Paläontologie, Abteilung B: Geologie und Paläontologie 1934(4):183-189
 H. G. McDonald and D. Perea. 2002. The large Scelidothere Catonyx tarijensis (Xenarthra, Mylodontidae) from the Pleistocene of Uruguay. Journal of Vertebrate Paleontology 22(3):677-683
 J. H. G. Melo. 1988. The Malvinokaffric realm in the Devonian of Brazil. N. J. McMillan, A. F. Embry, and D. J. Glass, eds. Devonian of the World, Volume I. Canadian Society of Petroleum Geologists. Calgary, Alberta, Canada 669-703
 A. Mones. 1988. Notas Paleontologicas Uruguayas, IV. Nuevos Registros de Mamiferos Fosiles de la Formacion San Jose (Plioceno-Pleistoceno Inferior) (Mammalia: Xenartha; Artiodactyla; Rodentia). Comunicaciones Paleontologicas del Museo de Historia Natural de Montevideo 1(20):255-270
 A. Mones. 1980. Nuevos elementos de la paleoherpetofauna del Uruguay (Crocodilia y Dinosauria) [New elements of the paleoherpetofauna of Uruguay (Crocodilia and Dinosauria)]. Actas II Congreso Argentino de Paleontologia y Bioestratigrafia y I Congreso Latinoamericano, Buenos Aires 1:265-277
 A. Mones and M. Ubilla. 1978. La Edad Deseadense (Oligoceno inferior) de la Formación Fray Bentos y su contenido paleontológico, con especial referencia a la presencia de Proborhyaena cf. gigantea Ameghino (Marsupialia: Borhyaenidae) en el Uruguay. Nota preliminar. Comunicaciones Paleontológicas del Museo de Historia Natural de Montevideo 7(1):151-158
 A. Mones. 1972. Lista de los vertebrados fosiles del Uruguay, I. Chondrichthyes, Osteichthyes, Reptilia, Aves [List of the fossil vertebrates of Uruguay, I. Chondrichthyes, Osteichthyes, Reptilia, Aves]. Comunicaciones Paleontologicas del Museo de Historia Natural de Montevideo 1(3):23-35
 D. Perea, M. Soto, J. Sterli, V. Mesa, P. Torino, G. Roland, and J. Da Silva. 2014. Tacuarembemys kusterae, gen. et sp. nov., a new Late Jurassic-?earliest Cretaceous continental turtle from western Gondwana. Journal of Vertebrate Paleontology 34(6):1329-1341
 D. Perea, P. Toriño, and M. R. Ciancio. 2014. La presencia del Xenartro Palaeopeltis inornatus Ameghino, 1894, en la Formación Fray Bentos (Oligoceno Tardío), Uruguay. Ameghiniana 51(3):254-258
 D. Perea. 2005. Pseudoplohophorus absolutus n. sp. (Xenarthra, Glyptodontidae), variabilidad en Sclerocaliptynae y redefinición de una biozona del Mioceno Superior de Uruguay. Ameghiniana 42(1):175-190
 D. Perea, M. Ubilla, and A. Rojas. 2003. First report of theropods from the Tacuarembó Formation (Late Jurassic–Early Cretaceous), Uruguay. Alcheringa 27:79-83
 D. Perea, M. Ubilla, A. Rojas and C. A. Goso. 2001. The West Gondwanan occurrence of the hybodontid shark Priohybodus, and the Late Jurassic–Early Cretaceous age of the Tacuarembó Formation, Uruguay. Palaeontology 44(6):1227-1235
 D. Perea and G. J. Scillato-Yane. 1995. Proeuphractus limpidus Ameghino, 1886 (Xenarthra, Dasypodidae, Euphractini): Osteologia comparada del craneo y elementos de la coraza asociados (Neogeno del Uruguay). Boletin de la Real Sociedad Espanola de Historia Natural 90:125-130
 D. Perea. 1993. Nuevos Dasypodidae fósiles de Uruguay. Revista Chilena de Historia Natural 66:149-154
 D. Perea and M. Ubilla. 1990. Los selacios (Chondrichthyes) de la Fm. Camacho (Mioceno sup., Uruguay). Revista de la Soco Uruguaya de Geología 2(4):5-13
 D. Perea. 1988. Dos Nothrotheriinae (Tardigrada, Megatheriidae) del Mio-Plioceno de Uruguay. Ameghiniana 25(4):381-288
 G. Piñeiro, M. Verde, M. Ubilla and J. Ferigolo. 2003. First Basal Synapsids ("Pelycosaurs") from the Upper Permian - ?Lower Triassic of Uruguay. Journal of Paleontology 77(2):389-392
 I. D. Pinto, G. Piñeiro, and M. Verde. 2000. First Permian insects from Uruguay. Pesquisas 27(1):89-96
 F. J. Prevosti, M. Ubilla, and D. Perea. 2009. Large extinct canids from the Pleistocene of Uruguay: systematic, biogeographic and paleoecological remarks. Historical Biology 21(1-2):79-89 
 M. A. Reguero, M. Ubilla, and D. Perea. 2003. A new species of Eopachyrucos (Mammalia, Notoungulata, Interatheriidae) from the Late Oligocene of Uruguay. Journal of Vertebrate Paleontology 23(2):445-457
 A. Rinderknecht, E. Bostelmann, and M. Ubilla. 2011. New genus of giant Dinomyidae (Rodentia: Hystricognathi: Caviomorpha) from the late Miocene of Uruguay. Journal of Mammalogy 92(1):169-178
 A. Rinderknecht, D. Perea, and H.G. McDonald. 2007. A New Mylodontinae (Mammalia, Xenarthra) from the Camacho Formation (Late Miocene), Uruguay. Journal of Vertebrate Paleontology 27(3):744-747
 M. Soto, D. Perea, and A. Cambiaso. 2012. First sauropod (Dinosauria: Saurischia) remains from the Guichón Formation, Late Cretaceous of Uruguay. Journal of South American Earth Sciences 33:68-79
 M. Soto and D. Perea. 2010. Late Jurassic lungfishes (Dipnoi) from Uruguay, with comments on the systematics of Gondwanan ceradontiforms. Journal of Vertebrate Paleontology 30(4):1049-1058
 M. Ubilla, D. Perea, and M. Bond. 1994. The Deseadan Land Mammal Age in Uruguay and the report of Scarrittia robusta nov. sp. (Leontiniidae, Notoungulata) in the Fray Bentos Formation (Oligocene - ? Lower Miocene). Geobios 27(1):95-102
 M. Ubilla and M. T. Alberdi. 1990. Hippidion sp. (Mammalia, Perissodactyla, Equidae) en Sedimentos del Pleistoceno Superior del Uruguay (Edad Mamifero Luganense). Estudios Geologia 46:453-464
 M. Ubilla. 1985. Mamiferos Fosiles, Geocronologia y Paleoecologia de la Fm. Sopas (Pleistoceno sup.) del Uruguay. Ameghiniana 22(3-4):185-196
 M. Ubilla. 1983. Sobre la presencia de Tapires fósiles en el Uruguay (Mammalia, Perissodactyla, Tapiridae). Revista de la Facultad de Humanidades y Ciencias. Serie Ciencias de la Tierra 1(3):85-102
 S. F. Vizcaino, A. Rinderknecht, and A. Czerwonogora. 2003. An Enigmatic Cingulata (Mammalia: Xenarthra) from the Late Miocene of Uruguay. Journal of Vertebrate Paleontology 23(4):981-983
 A. B. Zamuner. 1996. Araucarioxylon petriellae n. sp., una posible glossopteridal de la Formacion Melo (Permico Inferior), Uruguay. Ameghiniana 33(1):77-82

.Uruguay
 
 
Fossil
Fossil